Dallam is a ghost town in Brazos County, in the U.S. state of Texas. It is located within the Bryan-College Station metropolitan area.

History
The area in what is known as Dallam today (not the county) was first settled in the 1900s. It was a station on the International and Great Northern Railroad. There were three prisons in the area where prisoners were subjected to hard labor. It continued to be listed on maps in the 1950s but disappeared shortly after with no population recorded.

Geography

Education
Today, Dallam is located within the Navasota Independent School District.

References

Ghost towns in Texas